South Indian Education Society (SIES), founded in 1932, is one of the oldest educational societies in Mumbai. SIES has established a high school, a group of arts, science and commerce colleges, along with academic and professional institutions of higher learning with more than 18,000 students.

History
SIES was established in Mumbai by M V Venkateshwaran, with six students, being one of the oldest educational societies in Mumbai. A new SIES Complex at Nerul in Navi Mumbai was inaugurated in 1996.

In 2010, the income tax department raided the premises of the South Indian Education Society  and the residences of some of its office-bearers.

Academic institutions
Academic institutes run by SIES include:
SIES High School, Matunga
SIES College of Arts, Science, and Commerce, Sion (West)
SIES Institute of Comprehensive Education, Sion (West)
The SIES Institute of Medical and Laboratory Technology, Sion (West)
SIES College of Commerce and Economics, Sion (East)
SIES College of Management Studies, Nerul
SIES (NERUL) College of Arts, Science and Commerce
SIES Indian Institute of Environment Management, Nerul
SIES Graduate School of Technology (GST)
The SIES School of Packaging (Packaging Technology Centre), Nerul, Navi Mumbai
SIES Centre for Excellence in Management Research & Development, Nerul

Social institutions
Social institutions run by SIES include:
SIES Senior’s Home, Nerul
Sri Chandrasekarendra Saraswati Granthalaya, Nerul, Navi Mumbai
Sri Chandrasekarendra Saraswati Veda Vidya Pitha, Navi Mumbai

See also
 University of Mumbai
 SIES Nerul

References

External links
 Official SIES website

Educational institutions established in 1932
1932 establishments in India
Educational organisations in Maharashtra